The telluride phosphides are a class of mixed anion compounds containing both telluride and phosphide ions (Te2− P3−). The phosphidotelluride or telluridophosphide compounds have a [TeP]3− group in which the tellurium atom has a bond to the phosphorus atom. A formal charge of −2 is on the phosphorus and −1 on the tellurium. There is no binary compound of tellurium and phosphorus. Not many telluride phosphides are known, but they have been discovered for noble metals, actinides, and group 4 elements.

Structure 
The titanium group elements form layered hexagonal crystals that can be exfoliated to monolayers. These contain ditelluride Te22- units. These layered compounds can be intercalated to form non-stoichiometric compounds with zinc, copper or cadmium by heating with the metals. Actinide telluride phosphides contain diphosphide anions P2.

List

Artificial

References 

Tellurides
Phosphides